Archie Lee Chandler (December 16, 1922 – July 18, 2012) was an associate justice of the South Carolina Supreme Court. He attended The Citadel, but had to miss his senior year to join the military during World War II. He settled in Darlington, South Carolina to practice law, and was elected from there to the South Carolina House of Representatives in 1972. In 1976, he was made a trial court judge, a position he held until being elevated to the South Carolina Supreme Court. He was elected to the South Carolina Supreme Court in 1984 and became the chief justice in 1994. His election to be the new chief justice took place on February 23, 1994. He was sworn in on June 22, 1994.

References

Chief Justices of the South Carolina Supreme Court
Justices of the South Carolina Supreme Court
1922 births
People from Orangeburg, South Carolina
2012 deaths
Place of death missing
George Washington University alumni
University of South Carolina School of Law alumni
The Citadel, The Military College of South Carolina alumni
People from Darlington, South Carolina
American military personnel of World War II